is a former Japanese football player.

Playing career
Hiramatsu was born in Shizuoka on April 19, 1980. He joined J1 League club Shimizu S-Pulse from youth team in 1998. He played many matches as offensive midfielder from 2000 season. The club won the champions 1999–2000 Asian Cup Winners' Cup and 2001 Emperor's Cup. However his opportunity to play decreased from 2005 and left the club end of 2007 season. In April 2008, he moved to Japan Football League club FC Ryukyu and played in 1 season. After 9 months blank, In October 2009, he joined Regional Leagues club Shizuoka FC (later Fujieda MYFC). He retired end of 2010 season.

Club statistics

References

External links

1980 births
Living people
Association football people from Shizuoka Prefecture
Japanese footballers
J1 League players
Japan Football League players
Shimizu S-Pulse players
FC Ryukyu players
Fujieda MYFC players
Association football midfielders